Collette Roche is the Chief Operating Officer at Manchester United Football Club. She held a number of senior HR positions at large companies before becoming one of the small number of women who hold boardroom roles with Premier League football teams. In 2018, she was listed by Vogue as one of the 25 "most influential women working in Britain".

Career
Roche grew up in Lancashire, and attended Lancaster University, graduating from BBA Management with German in 1997. After her studies she took up a role in employee relations at Ford Motor Company in Dagenham, as part of the company's HR graduate scheme. In 1999 she moved to Siemens, where she was a HR executive, then in 2002 she became a HR Manager for commercial and international business at United Utilities. After seven years at United Utilities, Roche joined Manchester Airports Group, holding positions as chief of staff and acting managing director.

In spring 2018 Roche was appointed Chief Operating Officer at Manchester United, becoming the "highest-placed" woman at the club. She is also currently a board member of Northern Powerhouse and a non-executive director at JW Lees Brewery.

Recognition

 2015: Ranked at 31 in Northwest Business Insider Women 100 list.
 2017: Listed as one of "100 inspirational women from Greater Manchester" by the Manchester Evening News.
 2018: Listed as one of the 25 "most influential women working in Britain" in Vogue.

References

Year of birth missing (living people)
Living people
English women in business
Alumni of Lancaster University
English businesspeople